Garlin is a commune in France

Garlin may also refer to:
Garlin, Kentucky, a town in the United States
Garlin (surname)
Garlin Murl Conner (1919-1998), United States Army officer